Jabal As-Sahla' (also known as ), is a Mountain in Saudi Arabia. 

The mountain is located in the Sarawat Ranges, 'Asir Region at 18°42′0″N, 42°13′50″E. The mountain peak is 2,556 meters above sea level.

References

Sahla